Urchadh mac Murchadh (also called Archad Dearg) (died 943) was King of Maigh Seóla.

Biography

Urchadh is one of the earliest attested kings of Uí Briúin Seóla, whose rulers also seem to have exercised some authority over Iar Connacht. His dynasty, the Muintir Murchada, took their name from his father, Murchadh mac Maenach. The Ó Flaithbertaigh family would later claim him as an ancestor.

Family

Urchadh had an elder brother called Urumhain or Earca.

In addition to his son and successor, Donnchadh, he had three known daughters who achieved notable marriages:
 Bé Binn inion Urchadh, married Cennétig mac Lorcáin, king of Thomond.
 Creassa inion Urchadh, married Tadg mac Cathail, king of Connacht.
 Caineach inion Urchadh, married a prince of the Síol Muireadaigh.

Through his daughter Bé Binn, Urchadh was the maternal grandfather of Brian Boru, High King of Ireland (941-1014).

See also

 Ó Flaithbertaigh

References

 West or H-Iar Connaught Ruaidhrí Ó Flaithbheartaigh, 1684 (published 1846, ed. James Hardiman).
 Origin of the Surname O'Flaherty, Anthony Matthews, Dublin, 1968, p. 40.
 Irish Kings and High-Kings, Francis John Byrne (2001), Dublin: Four Courts Press, 
 Annals of Ulster at CELT: Corpus of Electronic Texts at University College Cork
 Annals of Tigernach at CELT: Corpus of Electronic Texts at University College Cork
Revised edition of McCarthy's synchronisms at Trinity College Dublin.
 Byrne, Francis John (2001), Irish Kings and High-Kings, Dublin: Four Courts Press, 

People from County Galway
943 deaths
10th-century Irish monarchs
Year of birth unknown